The list of shipwrecks in May 1878 includes ships sunk, foundered, grounded, or otherwise lost during May 1878.

1 May

2 May

3 May

4 May

5 May

6 May

7 May

8 May

9 May

10 May

11 May

12 May

13 May

14 May

15 May

16 May

17 May

18 May

19 May

20 May

21 May

22 May

23 May

24 May

25 May

27 May

28 May

29 May

30 May

31 May

Unknown date

References

Bibliography
Ingram, C. W. N., and Wheatley, P. O., (1936) Shipwrecks: New Zealand disasters 1795–1936. Dunedin, NZ: Dunedin Book Publishing Association.

1878-05
Maritime incidents in May 1878